Ahasin Wetei (Between Two Worlds) is a 2009 Sri Lankan-French drama film written and directed by  Vimukthi Jayasundara. It was entered into the main competition at the 66th edition of the Venice Film Festival.

Plot

Cast 
  Thusitha Laknath as Rajith
  Kaushalaya Fernando as Kanthi
  Huang Lu as the young Chinese woman

References

External links 

2009 drama films
2009 films
French drama films
2000s Sinhala-language films
Films directed by Vimukthi Jayasundara
Sri Lankan drama films
2000s French films